USC&GS McArthur was the name of two United States Coast and Geodetic Survey ships, and may refer to:

 , a survey ship in service in the United States Coast Survey from 1876 to 1878 and the Coast and Geodetic Survey from 1878 to 1915
 USC&GS McArthur (MSS 22), a survey ship in service in the Coast and Geodetic Survey from 1966 to 1970 and in the National Oceanic and Atmospheric Administration from 1970 to 2003 as